Gun Crazy is a 1950 American film noir.

Gun Crazy may also refer to:

 Guncrazy, a 1992 American crime film starring Drew Barrymore
 Gun Crazy: A Woman from Nowhere, a 2002 Japanese action film, followed by two sequels
 Gun Crazy (EP), an EP by The Mr. T Experience
 "Gun Crazy", a song by White Zombe from Let Sleeping Corpses Lie